Casse or CASSE may refer to:

 CASSE, Center for the Advancement of the Steady State Economy
 "Cassé", the Nolwenn Leroy's debut single from her eponymous album
 Cassi, a British tribe encountered by Julius Caesar
 Casse (surname)
 LaCasse, a surname
 Grande Casse, a mountain in the Graian Alps in France
 Pont Cassé, a populated place in Dominica
 Pont-du-Casse, a commune in the Lot-et-Garonne department in south-western France
 Digi Casse, a Japanese handheld game console
 Nez Cassé, a series of French locomotives